Nicola Ziadeh (Arabic:نقولا زيادة) (2 December 1907 – 27 July 2006) was historian and author of Palestinian origin, Lebanese nationality, born in Syria.

Early life 
Nicola Ziadeh was born in Bab Musalla neighborhood, one of the neighborhoods of Al-Midan area in Damascus. His parents were Palestinian from Nazareth. His father was an employee in the engineering department in the General Administration of the Hejaz railway in Damascus. At the beginning of the World War I, when he was 8 years old, his father was recruited to fight with the Ottoman Army, and while his father was staying in one of the soldiers' gathering centers waiting to be sent to the battle fronts, his father became ill and died before going to the battlefront.

In 1917 after his father's death, his family returned to Nazareth, where he lived with his uncle, who took care of them. Then his uncle was killed by a bomb thrown by a British plane, so his mother was forced to search for work to support the family. she found work in Jenin, so the family moved to live there. Nicola did not attend any school in Jenin for two years because there was no school there, as the German army took over the only school in the town. He made it up by reading and self-education, so he read many books that he borrowed from his neighbor, such as the Taghribat Bani Hilal, the biography of Saif ibn Dhi Yazan, and One Thousand and One Nights. In 1919 a public school was opened, so Nicola enrolled in it. In 1921, he was accepted to study at the "Dar Al-muealimin" in Jerusalem.

Nicola graduated from the "Dar Al-muealimin" after three years and worked for several weeks in the Nazareth School (at the time he was 16 years old). Then he moved to work as a teacher in Tarshiha (Acre District) and worked there for one year, after which he joined Acre school in Acre in 1925. Despite the fact that his inclination to teach mathematics he was assigned to teach history and geography. This decision had an impact on his life, as he liked the subject of history. He read books on history and was also acquainted with some excavation missions for foreign antiquities in Palestine that were excavating in Acre and Baysan. He was keen to visit many archaeological sites in Palestine, and at the beginning of his life and considered himself a "historian under training". In 1930, he published an article in the "Al-Muqtatif Magazine" about the Battle of Megiddo.

Nicola Ziadeh the teacher 

In 1935, he was chosen for a mission to study ancient history at the University of London, and this was a fulfillment of his hopes. He spent nearly 4 years in Europe, of which about 6 months were at the University of Munich in Germany. The university imposed on the student to learn two European languages other than English, so he chose to learn German and old French. He was able to obtain a bachelor's degree in 1939.

Nicola returned to Palestine in the summer of 1939, weeks before the start of World War II, and during the eight years following his return, he taught ancient history and Arab history at the Arab College (Jerusalem). His first book was published in 1943 CE entitled "Pioneers of the Eastern Arabs in the Middle Ages" (original text: rwwad alshrq alearabii fi aleusur alwustaa). In those years he also tried to transfer some of what he had learned in the West to his students through his lectures and books.

In 1947, he traveled to the University of London again to prepare for a doctorate, and his interest had moved from classical history to Islamic history. During this period, he wrote a number of articles in the excerpt, culture and others, dealing with various aspects of Arab history. Nicola spent two years in London preparing his doctorate on "Syria in the First Mamluk Era,". In 1950 he presented the thesis and received his doctorate.

After the occupation of Palestine, Nicolas immigrated to Lebanon, where he joined the American University in Beirut. He was appointed as an assistant professor, then he was appointed as a professor in 1958. He continued teaching there until 1973. After reaching fifty-five he retired from the American University, and supervised at Saint Joseph University – Beirut on doctoral thesis in Arab history, until 1992. He also taught at the University of Jordan for two years (1976–1978). Then he returned to Beirut working at the Lebanese University as a lecturer and supervisor.

Haissam Khalil is related to Nicola Ziadeh

Works 

Nicola Ziadeh has more than 40 books on Arab and Islamic history. He has translated many history books from English into Arabic, including books by Arnold Toynbee. He has about 150 articles and lectures delivered at Arab and international conferences. His complete books have been collected and issued in 23 volumes. Some of his books are:

 "Pioneers of the Arab East in the Ages" -(original text: Rawad Alshrq Al-Arabii fi Aleusur) – Cairo – 1943.
 "The Arab Dart" – (original text: Wathubat Al-Arab) Jerusalem 1945.
 "The Old World" – (original text: Alealam Alqadim) Two Parts – Jaffa 1942.
 "Pictures from Arab History" -(original text: Sur min Alttarikh Al-Arabii) – Cairo 1946.
 "Historical Arab personalities" -(original text: Shakhsiat Arabia Tarikhia) Jaffa 1946.
 "European Images" – (original text: Sur 'Uwrubiya) Jerusalem 1947.
 "Medieval world in Europe" -(original text: Alim Aleusur Alwustaa fi 'Uwrubba) Jerusalem 1947.
 "Cyrenaica, the eighth Arab state" -(original text: Bariqat Aldawla Alarabia Alththamina) Beirut 1950.
 "Arabism in the balance of nationalism" -(original text: Aluruba fi mizan alqawmia)  Beirut 1950.
 "Summits of the Arab Islamic Thought" -(original text: Qimam min Alfikr Alarabii Al'iislamii) Beirut 1987.
 "Geography and travels among the Arabs" -(original text: Aljughrafia w Alrihlat eind Al-Arab)  Beirut 1987.
 "Shamiyat: Studies in Civilization and History" -(original text: Shamiat Dirasat fi Alhadarat w Alttarikh) Beirut 1989.
 "African: Studies in Morocco and Western Sudan" -(original text: 'Afriqiat Dirasat fi Almaghrib Al-Arabii w Al-Suwdan Algharbi)  Beirut 1991.
 "Lebanese: women, history and image" -(original text: Libnaniaat Tarikh w Suar)  Beirut 1992.
 "My Days (biography)" -(original text: 'Ayami (Syra Dhatyah))  Beirut 1992.
 "Mashreqiyat in Links to Trade and Thought" -(original text: Mashriqiat fi Salat Altijara wa Lfikr) Beirut 1998.
 "Search of God" -(original text: Fi Sabil Albahth ean Allah) Beirut 2000.
 "Christianity and the Arabs" -(original text: Almasihia wa l-Arab)  Beirut 2001.
 "Greek thought and Arab culture: the Greek-Arabic translation movement in Baghdad and the early Abbasid society", Author: Dimitri Goutas; Translation: Nicola Ziadeh – 2003.

References

External links 

 An interview Nicola, Al-Riyadh newspaper 3/2/2000
 "Rawafed" program with Nicola Ziadeh, Al Arabiya channel, First episode 6/08/2004; second episode 13/08/2004A conversation with Nicola Ziadeh in Al-Arabi Magazine 5/1/2005 
 Nicola Ziadeh commandments for historians
 Nicola Ziadeh captured individual historical and humanitarian footage and re-dated it in his Creative Encyclopedia, Riyadh 12/17/2006
 Nicola Ziadeh passed away at the age of 99, Abdo Wazen Al-Hayat, 7/29/2006 Date of entry: 6 June 2009
 The news of his death in  "Aqlam" Cultural Magazine
Nicola Ziadeh's official website: http://nicolasziadeh.com/en_main.html

Some of his articles 

 Nicola Ziadeh, the secret of the Battle of Atlas. Al-Arabi Magazine Issue No. 399
 Nicola Ziadeh, May Ziadeh: Identity and Belonging. Al-Arabi Magazine Issue No. 496
 Nicola Ziadeh, producers of the Islamic civilization, Al-Arabi Magazine, Issue No. 509
 Nicola Ziadeh, producers of the Arab Islamic civilization. Al-Arabi Magazine Issue No. 517
 Nicola Ziadeh, Al-Quds As I Knew It .. Al-Arabi Magazine, Issue No. 571
 Nicola Ziadeh, November 2, 1917, the architect of the Jewish National in Palestine

Palestinian writers
20th-century Lebanese historians
1907 births
2006 deaths